Parasha – mountain in the Ukrainian Kingdom, the highest peak of the Parasha Range  in the Skole Beskids (Eastern Beskids).

Etymology
According to legend, the mountain is named after Parashka - the daughter (according to other versions - a woman) of Prince Svyatoslav Vladimirovich, son of Vladimir the Great, who was killed on this mountain by the troops of Sviatopolk I of Kyiv in 1015. This event was preceded by the battle between Sviatoslav and Sviatopolk near the town of Skole.

Fun facts
 Parashka is the highest peak, which lies entirely in the Lviv region.
 In good weather from the top of Parashka you can see the nearby village of Korchyn, as well as the cities of Stryy, Mykolayiv (cement plant), and even Lviv (90 km).

References

External links 
 Parashka, Mount
 Mount Parashka

Mountains of Ukraine
Mountains of the Eastern Carpathians
One-thousanders of Ukraine